Mungarina Minchu is a 1997 Indian Kannada language film directed by Rajendra Singh Babu starring Ramesh Arvind and Shilpa. The film is inspired from the 1942 Italian film Quattro passi fra le nuvole (Four Steps in the Clouds) and its 1995 American remake A Walk in the Clouds. The music for the film was composed by V. Manohar. The film was considered one of the best movies by Rajendra Singh Babu.

The film was awarded the Best Feature Film in Kannada at the 45th National Film Awards.

Cast
 Ramesh Aravind as Chethan
 Shilpa as Indu
 Lokesh as Ajja, Indu's grandfather
 B. Jayamma as Ajji, Indu's grandmother 
 Suman Nagarkar as Varsha
 Jayalakshmi as Varsha's aunty 
 Srinivasa Murthy as Indu's father
 Padma Kumata as Indu's mother 
 Karibasavaiah as Ajja's servant

Soundtrack 
All the songs are composed and written by V. Manohar.

References

External links

1990s Kannada-language films
Films based on Indian novels
Films based on non-fiction books
1997 films
Films based on Four Steps in the Clouds
Films directed by Rajendra Singh Babu
Films scored by V. Manohar
Best Kannada Feature Film National Film Award winners
Indian remakes of Italian films
Indian drama films